Severnoye Tushino District  or Northern Tushino is an administrative district (raion) of North-Western Administrative Okrug, and one of the 125 raions of Moscow, Russia.
In the district there are Alyoshkinsky forest and Severnoye Tushino park.

Location

The neighborhood  is in the northern part of North-Western Administrative Okrug.
On the South it borders on Yuzhnoye Tushino. The southern border consists of the Khimkinsky and Yana Raynisa boulevards that continue into Salomei Neris Street.
On the East it borders on Levoberezhny District. There is Khimka reservoir, also known as the Moscow Canal.

History

Social Situation

Despite of the high alcohol and drug abuse and suicide rate, the neighborhood is considered to be highly desirable due to its proximity to parks, beaches and solid housing and transportation infrastructure. Within the last 20 years the neighborhood has been through a revival due to an influx of immigrants from former Soviet states like Armenia, Georgia, Uzbekistan, etc.

See also

Administrative divisions of Moscow

References

Notes

Sources

Districts of Moscow
North-Western Administrative Okrug